Jack Stevens (24 July 1929 – 15 March 2013) was an  Australian rules footballer who played with Geelong and South Melbourne in the Victorian Football League (VFL).

Notes

External links 

1929 births
2013 deaths
Australian rules footballers from Victoria (Australia)
Geelong Football Club players
Sydney Swans players
North Geelong Football Club players